Sammi Cheung Sau Man (born 26 September 1987) is a Hong Kong TVB actress and the first runner-up of Miss Hong Kong 2010.

Biography 
Sammi Cheung was educated at ELCHK Ma On Shan Lutheran Primary School, Kiangsu-Chekiang College (Shatin). She entered University of Hong Kong to study chemistry after the Hong Kong Advanced Level Examination. However, she quit after a year since her mum got ill and she needed to work more to gain a living. A year later, the economic situation of her family became better, so she continued her studies in City University of Hong Kong, majoring business administration. She lived at Yiu On Estate, Ma On Shan with her family.

In 2010, she participated in the Miss Hong Kong 2010 and was the first runner-up of the show. She therefore became an artist of TVB. She was prominent for having a 34D bust. She has worked as a master of ceremonies since then as she was required by her boyfriend, Victor Chow, the son of Chow Chee Keong.

In 2020, Cheung starred in a TVB drama, The Witness as Yuki, becoming the first TV drama she starred.

References 

1987 births
Living people
Miss Hong Kong Pageants
21st-century Hong Kong actresses